The Westminster Group plc is a worldwide security company that specialises in Fire, Safety, Security and Defence. The firms' headquarters are at Westminster House, Blacklocks Hill, Overthorpe, near Banbury, Oxfordshire, United Kingdom. The group operates through a network of over 70 agents and international offices in over 45 countries, with a slightly growing customer base consisting of predominately: governments and government agencies, embassies, non-governmental organisations and blue chip commercial organisations.

Over the years the company has and still provides worldwide anti-terrorist equipment and systems, as well as specialist diver detection systems, perimeter and border security, pipeline protection systems and homeland security. It saw press in 2007 from the UK national newspaper The Times over the appointment of their then new Non-Executive chairman, Sir Malcolm Ross. National newspaper The Daily Express also commented about the company's intention to float on the Alternative Investment Market, as did The Times.

Corporate history
Westminster's Non-Executive chairman is Lieutenant-Colonel Sir Malcolm Ross GCVO OBE, Master of the Household of the Prince of Wales and formerly of the Royal Household, and the company is run by its chief executive officer, Peter Fowler.

Westminster was founded in 1988 as a security systems business (called "Westminster Security Systems") supplying systems and equipment to the UK domestic and commercial marketplace.

In 1990, Westminster Security Systems was acquired by Menvier-Swain Group plc, at which time Peter Fowler joined Westminster Security Systems as managing director. Westminster Security Systems gained a number of notable achievements being the first security company to achieve NACOSS (National Approval Council for Security Systems) approval and certification to BS 5750 Quality Assurance, the first security company to be awarded a SITO (Security Industry Training Organisation) training award and the first company to design and install a full colour town centre CCTV surveillance system within the UK, linking the towns of Banbury, Bicester and Kidlington. They also supplied several firms in these towns and Bloxham with fire and burglar alarms, but sales have slackened off due to the credit crunch.

In 1996 the directors mounted a successful MBO for Westminster Security Systems and in 1999 acquired London based security business CSG.

A restructuring in October 2000 resulted in the sale of Westminster Security Systems and its holding company, Westminster Security Group, to Chubb Electronic Security. The Westminster Group's land, buildings and manufacturing business, Westminster Technologies ltd, were retained and transferred over to the new Westminster Group Plc.

Westminster Technologies was a small contract electronic manufacturing business producing printed circuit boards and was sold in June 2006, leaving Westminster International to concentrate on the core Security and Defence business.

In 2006, Westminster Group Plc. purchased RMS Integrated Solutions ltd, specialists in distributed low-voltage systems; the company then listed on the AIM Market of the London Stock Exchange (WSG) in June 2007. In 2009 Westminster Group purchased Longmoor Group, the Close Protection and Security Training Services Group.

Corporate sub-structure 
Westminster Group Plc has four subsidiary companies: Westminster International ltd, RMS Integrated Solutions ltd, Longmoor Group and Westminster Security Systems.

Westminster International ltd This subsidiary has a broad-based security systems specialist that deals with providing designs and supplying installation and maintenance of a wide range of fire and security systems and equipment to domestic, retail, commercial and industrial premises, governmental establishments, banks, airports, sea ports, embassies etc. They operate in both the UK and abroad. Westminster International has uses specialist low frequency sound emissions in its experimental anti-frogman security systems. A sound that irritates or causes pain. Westminster International have also implemented this sonic factor, but they withheld the exact sound frequencies used.
RMS Integrated Solutions Ltd This subsidiary is a specialist provider of integrated low voltage systems throughout the UK, including Fire & Security Systems, alarms, CCTV, Structured Cabling, TV & Satellite Distribution and Wireless Data Distribution Technology.
Longmoor Security This subsidiary is a provider of security personnel and corporate security solutions (like pepper spray, mace, CS gas and tear gas) worldwide, protecting high profile international customers including organisations such as the BBC. All consultants, operators and trainers have served with the British Army's Royal Military Police, UK Special Forces or the UK Police Force.
Westminster Security Systems This subsidiary has specialist and more general purpose skills in installing both domestic, retail, commercial and industrial fire alarms, burglar alarms and on premises security systems.
Aviation Security Services (WASS)Provides security to the aviation and other transportation sectors protecting infrastructure, operations and assets.

Executive board members 
The board of the Westminster Group consisted as of 2001, of four executive, two non-executive directors and one non-executive chairman:
Lieutenant-Colonel Sir Malcolm Ross GCVO OBE (Non-Executive chairman, Chairman of Remuneration and member of the Audit Committees);
The Honourable Sir Michael Pakenham KBE CMG (non-executive director, Chairman of the Audit Committee and member of the Remuneration Committee);
The Right Honourable Sir John Wheeler KStJ, HQA, JP, DL (Non-Executive Chairman of Longmoor Group);
Peter Fowler (chief executive officer and Remuneration Committee);
Nicholas Mearing Smith (Finance Director and Remuneration Committee);
Roger Worrall (Commercial Director);
Stuart Fowler BEng (Hons) (Operations Director).

The company test grounds 
Westminster houses its test grounds and company headquarters on a 4½ acre site outside Banbury, UK . Many of the Group's products and services are demonstrated on the grounds and inside corporate headquarters (e.g. access control systems, surveillance monitoring etc.). The Group regularly hosts overseas visitors and clients to discuss specific requirements, test products and evaluate appropriate systems.

The test grounds hold some of the world's most sophisticated perimeter security solutions, pipeline protection systems and integrated thermal imaging/night vision CCTV camera systems. Many of these systems were showcased during Westminster's Open Days in September 2009. The BBC filmed and aired a two-minute segment, dubbed as "James Bond-Style Gadgets are devised for real". Westminster's Corporate Video demonstrates additional defence and security equipment not shown in the BBC video.

Share price
The 2022 share price is 1.95p per share, not similar to the 2010 yearly average.

See also
Chubb Locks
Yale (company)
Business Technology Association
Glass break detector
History of Banbury
Overthorpe, Northamptonshire
Physical Security

References

Companies based in Banbury
Security companies of the United Kingdom
1988 establishments in England
British companies established in 1988
Companies listed on the London Stock Exchange
Companies listed on the Alternative Investment Market